The Athletics at the 2016 Summer Paralympics – Men's 400 metres T38 event at the 2016 Paralympic Games took place on 16–17 September 2016, at the Estádio Olímpico João Havelange.

Heats

Heat 1 
10:00 16 September 2016:

Heat 2 
10:07 16 September 2016:

Final 
17:59 17 September 2016:

Notes

Athletics at the 2016 Summer Paralympics
2016 in men's athletics